The 2017–18 Austrian Hockey League season began on 8 September 2017 and ended on 20 April 2018.  The defending champion were the Vienna Capitals. On 20 April 2018, HC Bolzano won the Austrian Hockey Championship for the 2nd time in their history.

With Slovenian club, HDD Olimpija Ljubljana ending their tenure in the EBEL having been dissolved due to financial debt. The EBEL continued with 12 teams, following the return of KHL Medveščak Zagreb from a five year stint in the Kontinental Hockey League. The Croatian club had previously participated in the EBEL for four seasons from 2009 to 2013.

Teams

Standings

Regular season

Placement round

Qualification round

Playoffs

References

External links 

Erste Bank Eishockey Liga Statistics

Austrian Hockey League seasons
Aus
2017–18 in Croatian ice hockey
2017–18 in Italian ice hockey
2017–18 in Hungarian ice hockey
2017–18 in Czech ice hockey